Oliver Bjerrum Jensen (born 30 April 2002) is a Danish professional footballer who plays as a forward or left winger for Danish Superliga club Randers FC.

Career

Randers
Bjerrum Jensen played for Sunds IF and FC Midtjylland, before he joined Randers FC as a U17 player. In April 2019, he signed a three-year youth contract with Randers.

Bjerrum Jensen made his official debut for Randers on 30 October 2019 against Viby IF in the Danish Cup. On 28 June 2020, Bjerrum Jensen made his Danish Superliga debut against AC Horsens. He started on the bench, but replaced Tosin Kehinde in the 86th minute. Those two games were his only professional appearances in the 2019–20 season.

In the 2020–21 season, Bjerrum Jensen only played for Randers' U19 side. On 3 May 2022, Bjerrum Jensen signed a two-year contract extension with Randers and was promoted to the first team squad. After limited playing time in Randers, Jensen went on trial with Norwegian IK Start in January 2023.

References

External links
Oliver Bjerrum Jensen at DBU

Danish men's footballers
2002 births
Living people
Denmark youth international footballers
Association football forwards
Association football wingers
Danish Superliga players
Randers FC players
People from Herning Municipality
Sportspeople from the Central Denmark Region